Gildart Jackson is a British actor, writer, and audiobook narrator.  He is best known for portraying Gideon in Charmed and Giles the butler in the 2013 reality television series Whodunnit?. He was born on July 13th.

Career
He played an Elder and Headmaster of Magic School named Gideon in the TV series Charmed.  
His character is known for his double crossing of the Charmed Ones by trying to kill Piper Halliwell's child Wyatt because of his powers.

Jackson appeared in the soap operas The Young and the Restless and General Hospital.

In 2013, he made a guest appearance in a season 9 episode of Supernatural.

In 2015, Jackson participated in a stage production of Charles Evered's Class at the Falcon Theatre in Burbank, California.

In 2016, Jackson participated in a stage production of a redux version of William Shakespeare's The Tempest in the Odyssey Theatre in Los Angeles.

Since 2013, Jackson has provided the voice of the title character for the Alex Verus series of novels, by Benedict Jacka. He is credited as narrator of over 300 audiobooks.

In 2020, Jackson created a YouTube channel entitled Fireside Reading with Gildart Jackson, in which he gives complete and unabridged readings of classic literature. Such titles include Great Expectations, The Hound of the Baskervilles, Pride and Prejudice, Frankenstein, The Thirty-Nine Steps, The Wind in the Willows, Dracula, Wuthering Heights, Moby Dick, Anne of Green Gables and David Copperfield.

Personal life
Jackson has been married to Melora Hardin since 1997. They have two daughters, Rory (born in 2001) and Piper (born in 2005).

Filmography

Film

Television

Video games

References

External links

Living people
British male film actors
British male stage actors
British male television actors
British expatriate male actors in the United States
Male actors from London
20th-century British male actors
21st-century British male actors
British screenwriters
Audiobook narrators
British male voice actors
British male video game actors
Year of birth missing (living people)